The 1997 edition of the Singapore League Cup was a football tournament involving the teams in the S.League. It was renamed the Singapore Cup in 1998. The Singapore League Cup launched in 2007 is a different competition.

This first edition of the competition would feature nine teams drawn into three groups of three teams, playing on a home and away basis. The group winners and best runner-up would qualify for the semi-finals.

SAFFC would win the championship defeating Geylang United 1:0 in the final.

Teams

 Balestier Central
 Geylang United
 Home United
 Jurong
 Sembawang Rangers
 Singapore Armed Forces FC (SAFFC)
 Tampines Rovers
 Tiong Bahru United
 Woodlands Wellington

Group stage

Group 1

[26 Jul]
Balestier Central 3–1 Home United 
[30 Jul]
Home United 1–2 Singapore Armed Forces 
[2 Aug]
Singapore Armed Forces 1–0 Balestier Central 
[6 Aug]
Home United 5–4 Balestier Central 
[10 Aug]
Singapore Armed Forces 2–1 Home United 
[13 Aug]
Balestier Central 2–3 Singapore Armed Forces

Group 2

[26 Jul] 
Jurong 3–1 Woodlands Wellington 
[30 Jul]
Geylang United 2–1 Jurong 
[2 Aug]
Woodlands Wellington 0–0 Geylang United 
[6 Aug]
Woodlands Wellington 3–1 Jurong 
[10 Aug]
Jurong 1–3 Geylang United 
[13 Aug]
Geylang United 3–0 Woodlands Wellington

Group 3

[Jul 26] 
Tiong Bahru United 3–1 Tampines Rovers 
[Jul 30]
Tampines Rovers 3–1 Sembawang Rangers 
[Aug 2]
Sembawang Rangers 0–3 Tiong Bahru United 
[Aug 6]
Tampines Rovers 2–0 Tiong Bahru United 
[Aug 10]
Sembawang Rangers 0–3 Tampines Rovers 
[Aug 13]
Tiong Bahru United 0–0 Sembawang Rangers

Semi-finals

First leg

Second leg

Final

External links
 Official S.League website
 Football Association of Singapore website

1997
1997 domestic association football cups
1997 in Singaporean football